Dragon Beat: Legend of Pinball is a pinball video game playable on the PlayStation. It was released in Japan on November, 27, 1997. The game was developed and published by Map Japan. The game was rereleased for the PlayStation 3 as a "PSOne Import" in the United States on May 20, 2014. The rerelease was published by GungHo Online Entertainment. The game features three distinct tables and two different game modes.

References 

1997 video games
Pinball video games
PlayStation (console) games